The Arnold–Beltrami–Childress (ABC) flow or Gromeka–Arnold–Beltrami–Childress (GABC) flow is a three-dimensional incompressible velocity field which is an exact solution of Euler's equation. Its representation in Cartesian coordinates is the following:

 
 
 

where  is the material derivative of the Lagrangian motion of a fluid parcel located at 

It is notable as a simple example of a fluid flow that can have chaotic trajectories.

It is named after Vladimir Arnold, Eugenio Beltrami, and Stephen Childress. Ippolit S. Gromeka's (1881) name has been historically neglected, though much of the discussion has been done by him first.

See also
Beltrami flow

References

 V. I. Arnold. "Sur la topologie des ecoulements stationnaires des fluides parfaits". C. R. Acad. Sci. Paris, 261:17–20, 1965.

Chaos theory
Fluid dynamics
Differential equations